A list of films produced in Pakistan in 1984 (see 1984 in film) and in the Urdu language:

1984

See also
1984 in Pakistan

References

External links
 Search Pakistani film - IMDB.com

1984
Pakistani
Films